Fujichrome Fortia SP was a brand of ISO 50 daylight-balanced professional color reversal film produced by the Japanese company Fujifilm between 2005 and 2007. It was an ultra-high saturation slide film with limited release in Japan only. Fortia SP was the successor of the original Fujichrome Fortia professional ISO 50 color reversal film, which was released in a limited run in 2004.

References

See also 
 Velvia
 Provia
 
 Sensia

Fujifilm photographic films